In Overdrive is an album released in  2009 by American country music artist Aaron Tippin. The album is composed of truck driving song covers with the exception of the last two tracks, which are original. Tippin's 2008 single, "Drill Here, Drill Now", is also featured on the album. Among the covers are "Drivin' My Life Away" (a number-one country single for Eddie Rabbitt) and "Roll On (Eighteen Wheeler)" (a number-one hit for Alabama).

Track listing

Personnel
Pat Buchanan - electric guitar
Tim Grogan - drums
Rich Herring - acoustic guitar
Mike Johnson - steel guitar
Rod Lewis - bass guitar
Bobby Lovett - banjo, electric guitar
Brent Mason - electric guitar
Jerry Roe - drums, acoustic guitar
David Sloas - background vocals
Aaron Tippin - lead vocals
Thea Tippin - background vocals
Darrin Vincent - background vocals

Track information and credits adapted from the album's liner notes.

Charts

See also
Drill, baby, drill

References

2009 albums
Aaron Tippin albums